Yakovlevo is a rural locality (a village) in Kadnikov, Sokolsky District, Vologda Oblast, Russia. The population was 11 as of 2002.

Geography 
Yakovlevo is located 42 km east of Sokol (the district's administrative centre) by road. Zamoshye is the nearest rural locality.

References 

Rural localities in Sokolsky District, Vologda Oblast